Charles James Clayden is an English footballer who plays as a wing back or winger for  club Charlton Athletic.

Career

Leyton Orient
Clayden made his professional debut for Leyton Orient coming on as a 62nd-minute substitute in a 3–1 victory on the final day of the 2017–18 National League season against Gateshead.

Charlton Athletic
Clayden joined Charlton Athletic on a free transfer from Leyton Orient on 30 May 2019.

Clayden made his debut for Charlton on 7 August 2021 coming on as an 89th-minute substitute in a 0–0 draw on the opening day of the 2021–22 League One season against Sheffield Wednesday.

Dulwich Hamlet (loan)
On 24 October 2020, Clayden joined non-league Dulwich Hamlet on a month's loan.

Wealdstone (loan)
On 18 February 2022, Clayden joined National League side Wealdstone on a month's loan. Clayden scored his first senior goal in a 4–1 defeat to Eastleigh.

On 19 March 2022 it was announced that Clayden had extended his loan until the end of the season. He went on to make a total of 18 appearances for the club.

Bromley (loan)
On 7 October 2022, Clayden joined Bromley on loan until 6 January 2023.

Career statistics

References

External links
 

2000 births
Living people
English footballers
Association football forwards
Charlton Athletic F.C. players
Dulwich Hamlet F.C. players
Wealdstone F.C. players
Bromley F.C. players